Bactericera is a psyllid bug genus in the family Triozidae.

Species

 Bactericera acutipennis
 Bactericera albiventris (Förster, 1848)
 Bactericera alboparia
 Bactericera allivora
 Bactericera alticola
 Bactericera antennata
 Bactericera arbolensis
 Bactericera arctica
 Bactericera arcuata
 Bactericera artemisiae
 Bactericera artemisicola
 Bactericera artemisisuga
 Bactericera athenae
 Bactericera atkasookensis
 Bactericera atraphaxidis
 Bactericera baiancogti
 Bactericera bielawskii
 Bactericera bifurca
 Bactericera bimaculata
 Bactericera bohemica
 Bactericera breviatiformis
 Bactericera bucegica
 Bactericera calcarata
 Bactericera calceolaris
 Bactericera californica
 Bactericera camplurigra
 Bactericera capensis
 Bactericera carthamae
 Bactericera cockerelli
 Bactericera commutata
 Bactericera cousiniae
 Bactericera crasseflagellata
 Bactericera crithmi
 Bactericera cucullata
 Bactericera curvata
 Bactericera curvatinervis
 Bactericera cuspidata
 Bactericera daedala
 Bactericera daghestanica
 Bactericera distinctissima
 Bactericera dorsalis
 Bactericera dracunculi
 Bactericera drepanoides
 Bactericera dubia
 Bactericera dzhamantalica
 Bactericera electa
 Bactericera equisetifolii
 Bactericera falcata
 Bactericera femoralis
 Bactericera ferulae
 Bactericera flavipunctata
 Bactericera gobica
 Bactericera grammica
 Bactericera harrisoni
 Bactericera hissarica
 Bactericera horrida
 Bactericera imitodua
 Bactericera incerta
 Bactericera janisalicis
 Bactericera jilinisalicis
 Bactericera kartlica
 Bactericera koreana
 Bactericera koreostriola
 Bactericera kratochvili
 Bactericera lavaterae
 Bactericera ligulariae
 Bactericera lobata
 Bactericera loginovae
 Bactericera lycii
 Bactericera lyrata
 Bactericera maculipennis
 Bactericera maura
 Bactericera melanoparia
 Bactericera minuta
 Bactericera miyatakei
 Bactericera miyatakeiana
 Bactericera modesta
 Bactericera mora
 Bactericera myohyangi
 Bactericera nigriceps
 Bactericera nigricornis
 Bactericera nobilis
 Bactericera obuncata
 Bactericera octocalcarata
 Bactericera oreophila
 Bactericera parastriola
 Bactericera permira
 Bactericera perrisii
 Bactericera petiolata
 Bactericera pletschi
 Bactericera polygoni
 Bactericera prangi
 Bactericera pulla
 Bactericera reuteri
 Bactericera rossica
 Bactericera rubra
 Bactericera sachalinensis
 Bactericera salicigra
 Bactericera salicivora
 Bactericera salictaria
 Bactericera schwarzii
 Bactericera scutinigra
 Bactericera seselii
 Bactericera shepherdiae
 Bactericera silvarnis
 Bactericera singularis
 Bactericera striola
 Bactericera substriola
 Bactericera taeguensis
 Bactericera tangae
 Bactericera tiliae
 Bactericera tremblayi
 Bactericera trigonica
 Bactericera tubconica
 Bactericera varians
 Bactericera vellae
 Bactericera versicolor
 Bactericera viresalicis
 Bactericera vitiis
 Bactericera xanthura
 Bactericera xeranthemica
 Bactericera yamagishii
 Bactericera zhaoi

References

External links
 Psyl'list

Triozidae
Psylloidea genera